The Journal of the Society of Architectural Historians is a quarterly peer-reviewed academic journal published by the University of California Press on behalf of the Society of Architectural Historians. It was established in 1941 as the Journal of the American Society of Architectural Historians, and was renamed to its current title in the post-World War II period, around 1945. The founding editor-in-chief was Turpin Bannister. The current editor is David Karmon, professor at Holy Cross. The journal's issues include scholarly articles on international topics in architectural history, book reviews, architectural exhibition reviews, field notes, and editorials on the relationship between the built environment, its study, and interdisciplinary topics.

References

External links 
 
 Print: 
 Online: 

Quarterly journals
English-language journals
University of California Press academic journals
Publications established in 1941
Architectural history journals